The 1999 Rio de Janeiro motorcycle Grand Prix was the fifteenth round of the 1999 Grand Prix motorcycle racing season. It took place on 24 October 1999 at the Autódromo Internacional Nelson Piquet.

This was the last race without a current or former premier class champion on the grid until the 2020 Aragon Grand Prix.

Valentino Rossi won the 250cc race and the title at this event his 2nd title in his young career

500 cc classification

250 cc classification

125 cc classification

Championship standings after the race (500cc)

Below are the standings for the top five riders and constructors after round fifteen has concluded. 

Riders' Championship standings

Constructors' Championship standings

 Note: Only the top five positions are included for both sets of standings.

References

Rio de Janeiro motorcycle Grand Prix
Rio de Janeiro
Rio de Janeiro Grand Prix